Rod Johnson is an American politician who was a member of the Oregon State Senate.

Personal life 
Johnson was accused of sexual harassment by five female legislative employees while in office, which he dismissed as being the result of a "politically motivated witch hunt" against him.

His daughter Jessica George was appointed to the Oregon House of Representatives in December 2021.

References 

Living people
Year of birth missing (living people)
20th-century American politicians
Republican Party Oregon state senators